I Don't Wanna Die may refer to:

 "I Don't Wanna Die", a song by the Unicorns from their album Who Will Cut Our Hair When We're Gone?
 "I Don't Wanna Die", a song by Hollywood Undead from their album American Tragedy
 "I Don't Wanna Die", a song by G Herbo from his album 25
 "I Don't Wanna Die...", a song by Kim Petras from her album Turn Off the Light, Vol. 1

See also 

 "I Don't Wanna Die Anymore", a song by New Radicals from Maybe You've Been Brainwashed Too